Claudio Alonso García Muñoz (born 10 April 1997) is a Peruvian footballer who plays for Spanish club Rápido de Bouzas as a winger.

Club career
García was born in Pisco, and was an Alianza Lima youth graduate. In 2016 he moved to Alianza Atlético, and made his first team – and Primera División – debut on 1 May of that year by starting in a 2–1 home win against Comerciantes Unidos.

In 2017, García moved to Segunda División side Sport Victoria. After featuring sparingly he moved abroad, joining Spanish Segunda División B side Rápido de Bouzas on 26 August of that year.

References

External links

1997 births
Living people
People from Pisco, Peru
Peruvian footballers
Association football wingers
Peruvian Primera División players
Peruvian Segunda División players
Alianza Atlético footballers
Peru youth international footballers
Peru under-20 international footballers
Peruvian expatriate footballers
Peruvian expatriate sportspeople in Spain
Expatriate footballers in Spain